The Black Secret is a 1919 American adventure film serial directed by George B. Seitz. The film was recorded in both Fort Lee, New Jersey, as well as in the nearby Hudson Palisades. Recording took place during a time when many of the early 20th century film studios in America's first motion picture industry were based there.

The film is currently considered to be lost. However, a portion survives, and, in 2021, was digitized and released by a YouTube channel based in the United Kingdom.

Cast
 Pearl White as Evelyn Ereth
 Walter McGrail as Ray McKay
 Wallace McCutcheon Jr. as Frederick
 George B. Seitz
 Henry G. Sell
 Marjorie Milton
 Harry Semels
 Francis Wightwick

See also
 List of film serials
 List of film serials by studio
 List of lost films

References

External links

Newly Discovered Footage of "The Black Secret" (1919) Starring Pearl White

1919 films
1919 adventure films
1919 lost films
American silent serial films
American black-and-white films
American adventure films
Films based on works by Robert W. Chambers
Films directed by George B. Seitz
Films shot in Fort Lee, New Jersey
Lost American films
Lost adventure films
1910s American films
Silent adventure films
1910s English-language films